Fonino is a rural locality (a village) in Yershovskoye Rural Settlement, Sheksninsky District, Vologda Oblast, Russia. The population was 2 as of 2002.

Geography 
Fonino is located 35 km northwest of Sheksna (the district's administrative centre) by road. Zabolotye is the nearest rural locality.

References 

Rural localities in Sheksninsky District